Coleophora praeclara is a moth of the family Coleophoridae.

The larvae feed on Astragalus species, including Astragalus paghmanicus. They feed on the leaves of their host plant.

References

praeclara
Moths described in 1994